Shankar Gobind Chowdhury is a Bangladesh Awami League politician and the former Member of Parliament of Natore-2. He was the organizer of the Liberation War of Bangladesh.

Career
Chowdhury was elected member of the Pakistan National Assembly in the 1970 elections as a candidate of Awami League. He was also a member of the Constituent Assembly of Bangladesh in 1972. When BAKSAL was introduced in 1975, he was appointed Governor of Natore District.

Chowdhury was elected to parliament from Natore-2 as a Bangladesh Awami League candidate in 1991.

Death and legacy 
Chowdhury died on 13 September 1997.

In 2016, the Bangladesh government posthumously awarded Chowdhury the Independence Day Award in 2018. In November 1991, Prime Minister Khaleda Zia laid the foundation of Natore Stadium. Construction began in 1996 and was completed in 18 months. On 12 January 1999, it was inaugurated by Prime Minister Sheikh Hasina as Shankar Govinda Chowdhury Stadium.

References

Awami League politicians
5th Jatiya Sangsad members
Year of birth missing
1997 deaths
Recipients of the Independence Day Award